Beclin-1 is a protein that in humans is encoded by the BECN1 gene. Beclin-1 is a mammalian  ortholog of the yeast autophagy-related gene 6 (Atg6)  and BEC-1 in the C. elegans nematode. This protein interacts with either BCL-2 or PI3k class III, playing a critical role in the regulation of both autophagy and cell death.

Role in disease 

Beclin-1 plays an important role in tumorigenesis, and neurodegeneration, being implicated in the autophagic programmed cell death. Ovarian cancer with upregulated autophagy has a less aggressive behavior and is more responsive to chemotherapy.

Schizophrenia is associated with low levels of Beclin-1 in the hippocampus of those affected, which causes diminished autophagy which in turn results in increased neuronal cell death.

Interactions 

BECN1 has been shown to interact with:
 Bcl-2
 BCL2L2
 GOPC 
 MAP1LC3A
 Rubicon
 UVRAG

Modulators 

Trehalose Trehalose reduces p62/Beclin-1 ratio and increases autophagy in the frontal cortex of ICR mice, possibly by increasing Beclin-1.

References

Further reading

External links 
 
 

Genes
Human proteins